The Assassin is the debut studio album by American rapper Big Ed. It was released on September 1, 1998 through No Limit Records and Priority Records. It was mostly produced by all members of Beats By the Pound, with one track each produced by former 2 Live Crew member Mr. Mixx, as well as Les G and MP (K-Lou).

Charts
The Assassin peaked at #15 on the Billboard 200 and #3 on the Top R&B/Hip-Hop Albums.

Track listing

Charts

References

1998 debut albums
Big Ed albums
No Limit Records albums
Priority Records albums